Medical Trust Hospital is a "super speciality" hospital located at Kochi in Kerala, India.

Since its inception in 1973, the hospital has come a long way with the commitment and passion of over 1,500 dedicated healthcare professionals, comprising internationally acclaimed doctors/surgeons, efficient support staff, and world-class facilities. Providing personalised patient-centred treatment and care, 24/7 support and services,  Medical Trust Hospital uphold high ethical standards while breaking new ground in the field of healthcare and medicine.

The hospital was established by Dr. P. A. Verghese . Medical Trust Hospital now has a world-class medical complex integrated with the best of all infrastructure and medical expertise, to cater to the needs of International and local patients with equal passion.

Medical Trust Hospital also dedicates its advanced facilities and know-how to research and development making further inroads in the field of health and medicine. The hospital runs educational institutions to impart knowledge and training in Nursing, Physiotherapy, Paramedical Sciences and Radiological Techniques, to build an efficient workforce of healthcare professionals, and to adequately handle the global requirements of medical and surgical emergencies.

Today, with over five decades of experience in the field,  the hospital is the first choice for providing medical care to visiting International delegates and eminent personalities; for corporates or overseas companies to handle their emergency rescue and evacuation services; for all International Sports Events conducted in Cochin, Kerala, to provide medical assistance; among others.

Major Achievements

Medical Trust Hospital has the credit of being the:
 First Multi-organ Transplantation in Kerala
 First Successful Heart Transplantation in Kerala
 First awake CABG in the state
 First Laparoscopic Cholecystectomy
 First Accident care unit in private sector
 First Reimplantation of severed limbs
 First Successful Kidney Transplantation in Kerala
 First Cadaver Kidney transplantation in Kerala
 First to organise Multi super specialties in private sector
 First to treat Patent Ductus Arteriosus without surgery(PDA coiling)
 First to perform Renal Stenting
 First to perform Haemoperfusion
 First hospital in Kerala to start TURP/TURBT
 First to start Thoracoscopic Lobar Resection of the lung
 First to start Aneurysm & AVM (brain) surgery
 First to start Skull base Surgery
 First to start Odontoid screw fixation
 First to start Trans-thoracic Spinal instrumentation
 First Hospital in state and third in the country to start Geriatric Oncology Unit
 First to start Sternal split for Upper Dorsal lesions
 First Hospital in Kerala to start dedicated department for Sports Medicine
 First Hospital to launch Healthy Ageing Club and Senior Citizens Health Program in the state

Founder and Management
A great visionary and a versatile healthcare professional, Dr. P.A. Verghese (10.05.1929-19.03.2004) laid the foundations of the Medical Trust Hospital. Combining technology to clinical skill, Dr. Pulikkan, as he is fondly known, set out make revolutionary changes in the field of healthcare.

Over the years the Medical Trust Hospital has beat the odds and has made path-braking achievements. It has been the dedication, perseverance and undying passion of Dr. Pulikkan and his team of skilled doctors and other healthcare professionals that has made Medical Trust Hospital one of the providers of premium medical care.

Mr. P.V. Antony, PGDHHA(UK)

Chairman

Dr. P.V. Louis, MBBS, MD

Managing Director

Dr. P.V. Thomas, MD, DMRD

Medical & Commercial Director

Mr. P.V. Xavier

Finance Director

Key Doctors

Dr Deepu George - Internal Medicine 
Dr George Mothi - Pulmonology 
Dr Haroon Pillai - Neurosurgery
Dr Mohammed Iqubal - Nephrology 
Dr Naveen Thomas - Dermatology 
Dr Sagy Kurutukulam - Cardiology
Dr Bipin Theruvil - Orthopedics 
Dr Jayaprakash - Endocrinology 
Dr Dilip Mathen - Neurology
Dr Mathew Dominic - ENT 
Dr Jino Joy - Geriatric Medicine
Dr Varun Raj - Oncology 
Dr C J John - Psychiatry

References

External links
 official website 

Hospital buildings completed in 1973
Hospitals in Kochi
1973 establishments in Kerala
20th-century architecture in India